Sergei Sergeyevich Mizgiryov (born 9 June 2000) is a Russian football player.

Club career
He made his debut for FC Khimki on 15 September 2020 in a Russian Cup game against FC Zenit Irkutsk.

References

External links
 
 
 

2000 births
Sportspeople from Barnaul
Living people
Russian footballers
Association football defenders
FC Dynamo Barnaul players
FC Khimki players